Live at the Garden is a 1967 live album by James Brown and The Famous Flames. It was recorded on January 14, 1967 in the middle of a ten-day engagement at the Latin Casino in Cherry Hill, New Jersey - Brown's first at an upscale nightclub. Like most of Brown's live albums, overdubbed crowd noise was added to the original recording for its LP release. It included one new song, "Let Yourself Go", which was recorded after hours at the casino; it appeared on the album disguised as a live recording. Although Live at the Garden peaked at #41 on the Billboard album chart, it came to be overshadowed in Brown's catalog by his next live album, Live at the Apollo, Volume II, recorded later the same year and released in 1968.

In 2009 Hip-O Select released a 2-CD Expanded Edition of Live at the Garden. In addition to the contents of the original LP, it included additional, overdub-free live recordings from Brown's Latin Casino engagement, along with the "Let Yourself Go" recording session.
Because Flames member Lloyd Stallworth had left the group during 1966, The Famous Flames lineup on this 1967 album consisted of Bobby Byrd , Bobby Bennett , and Brown himself. 
In 1968, after this live album was recorded,(and after the double album, Live at The Apollo, Volume 2), Byrd and Bennett would also leave, and The Famous Flames were officially disbanded, leaving Brown as a solo act.

Track listing

Original LP

2009 Expanded Edition

References

James Brown live albums
1967 live albums
King Records (United States) live albums
The Famous Flames albums